Jared Donaldson was the defending champion, but he lost in the first round to Alex Bolt.

Wu Di won the title, defeating Kyle Edmund 4–6, 6–3, 6–4 in the final.

Seeds

Draw

Finals

Top half

Bottom half

References
 Main Draw
 Qualifying Draw

Tennis Championships of Maui - Singles